Acartauchenius himalayensis is a species of sheet weaver found in Pakistan. It was described by Tanasevitch in 2011.

References

Linyphiidae
Spiders described in 2011
Spiders of Asia
Invertebrates of Pakistan